This is a list of frigates currently in service with the German Navy.

F122 Bremen class 

General purpose frigates, 130m/3680t, in service since 1982

Einsatzflottille 2 (flotilla), 4. Fregattengeschwader (frigate squadron), Wilhelmshaven:

F213 Augsburg
F214 Lübeck

F123 Brandenburg class 

ASW frigates, 139m/4900t, in service since 1994

Einsatzflottille 2, 2. Fregattengeschwader, Wilhelmshaven:
F215 Brandenburg
F216 Schleswig-Holstein
F217 Bayern
F218 Mecklenburg-Vorpommern

F124 Sachsen class 

AAW frigates, 143m/5690t, in service since 2004

Einsatzflottille 2, 2. Fregattengeschwader, Wilhelmshaven:
F219 Sachsen
F220 Hamburg
F221 Hessen

F125 Baden-Württemberg class 
4 Multi-purpose frigates, optimized for long expeditionary peacemaking/peacekeeping missions, 149,5m/ 7200t,  4 planned to replace the F122 Bremen class

F222 Baden-Württemberg
F223 Nordrhein-Westfalen
F224 Sachsen-Anhalt
F225 Rheinland-Pfalz

 
 
Frigates
Germany, current